"Hold Me" is a popular song by Jack Little, Dave Oppenheim, and Ira Schuster. The song was published in 1933; it was recorded by co-writer Little (as Little Jack Little), and covered by Eddy Duchin, Greta Keller and Ted Fio Rito.

A new version was recorded by P. J. Proby in 1964, and reached No. 3 on the UK Singles Chart. The song features Jimmy Page on rhythm guitar, Big Jim Sullivan on lead guitar (using a fuzz box loaned to him by Page) and Bobby Graham on drums.  Proby's version also charted at No. 10 in Ireland, becoming his only chart entry in that country.

BA Robertson version 
In 1981, it was covered by B. A. Robertson and Maggie Bell, reaching No. 11 on the UK chart, and also peaking at No. 11 in Ireland.

Charts 
Eddy Duchin and His Orchestra

Ted Fioroto and His Orchestra

Hotel Commodore Dance Orchestra

Don Cornell

P.J. Proby

Bert Kaempfert and His Orchestra

The Baskerville Hounds

BA Robertson & Maggie Bell

Other recordings 
 Brenda Lee - for her album Sincerely, Brenda Lee (1962)
 Dean Martin - recorded for Apollo Records in November 1947
 Eddie Fisher - included on the album I'm in the Mood for Love (1952)
 Peggy Lee - recorded on November 19, 1947 for Capitol Records (catalog No. 15298)
 Val Doonican - Val Doonican Rocks, But Gently (1967)
 Dr. Jonas Fjeld - for the album Take Two Aspirins and Call Me in the Morning (1975)
 The Rubinoos - for their album Back to the Drawing Board! (1979)

References

External links
 Song lyric

1933 songs
1933 singles
1954 singles
1964 singles
1981 singles
Songs with music by Jack Little (songwriter)
Songs with music by Ira Schuster
BA Robertson songs